The 2011 Australian Football International Cup (or IC21) is the fourth edition of the Australian Football International Cup, an international Australian rules football competition run by the Australian Football League.

It was contested between 12 and 27 August 2011 by 18 nations, with games played in both Melbourne and Sydney. Two matches were played as curtain raisers to AFL premiership matches, USA vs South Africa at Stadium Australia and the IC Grand Final at the Melbourne Cricket Ground. 

Ireland won its second men's championship, and the inaugural women's championship (Ryan Aslett Cup).

Competing Teams
On 1 July 2011, the AFL confirmed the 18 men's teams that would participate in the 2011 International Cup:

17 of these clubs represented single nations, and one (the Peres Team for Peace) represented both Israel and the Palestinian Territories.

As well as the above Men's teams, for the first time in the history of the tournament, there was also a Women's competition, with five teams participating:

Men's Fixtures

Round 1
Before the tournament, the 18 clubs were seeded into six groups of three, ranked based on previous performance in International Cups, or in the case of the newer teams, at the discretion of the AFL:

Matches
The first round of matches was played with modified rules, most significantly the reduction of game length to two-quarters, in the same manner as the 2011 NAB Cup.

Round 2
At the conclusion of Round 1, the best two teams from each Group were regrouped into four groups of three teams, based on Win-Draw-Loss performance and Percentage in Round 1, all within a larger group known as Division 1. These teams would remain in contention for the International Cup title. The remaining six were regrouped in the same way, into two subgroups of Division 2. These teams would compete for a secondary prize.

The structure of the groups was as follows:

Division 1
Division 1 teams played one match against each team in their respective groups.

Division 2
Division 2 teams played one match against each team in their respective groups, as well as a single "cross-over" match against a team in the opposite group.

Division 1 Semi-Finals
At the conclusion of Round 2, the teams were once again re-seeded based on their performance in the previous round; the teams in Division 1 were seeded in positions 1-12, and the teams in Division 2 in positions 13–18.

These matches were played at the same time as the final round 2 Division 2 matches; the Division 2 teams did not participate in this round.

Finals

Women's Fixtures

Round 1
In the opening round of the Women's International Cup, the five teams played each other once, over the course of 10 days.

Finals
At the conclusion of Round 1, Australia, the lowest ranked team in the competition based on points and percentage, was eliminated and finished in 5th place. The remaining four clubs will compete in the finals.

World Teams

Men's World Team

Women's World Team

References

Australian Football International Cup
Australian Football International Cup, 2011